Kseniya Mikhailovna Kachalina (born May 3, 1971) is a Russian actress.

Biography
Kseniya Mikhailovna Kachalina was born May 3, 1971. She studied two years at the acting department at the Saratov Conservatory named L. Sobinov (1987-1988), and then, in 1995, graduated from the All-Russian State University of Cinematography named after S. A. Gerasimov (aka VGIK) class of Sergey Solovyov and Valery Rubinchik.

Her acting career began in the 1990s and includes roles such as Grand Duchess Tatiana in Gleb Panfilov's The Romanovs: A Crowned Family (2000).

Filmography
 Tma (1991)
 No Love (1991)
 Arbitr (1992)
 Over the Dark Water  (1993)
 The First Circle   (1993)
 Three Sisters (1994)
 Letters in a Previous Life (1994)
 Men's Revelations  (1995)
 Whoever Circus Burned and Clowns Ran outofter (1996)
 Circus Burned and Clowns Ran Оut (1998)
 Dukh (1999)
 The Romanovs: An Imperial Family (2000)
  (2001)
 Goddess: How I fell in Love  (2004)
 The First Circle  (2006)

References

External links

1971 births
Living people
Actors from Saratov
Soviet film actresses
Russian film actresses
Russian television actresses
Gerasimov Institute of Cinematography alumni
Saratov Conservatory alumni